This is a list of ancient Roman temples, built during antiquity by the people of ancient Rome or peoples belonging to the Roman Empire. Roman temples were dedicated to divinities from the Roman pantheon.

Substantial remains

Most of the best survivals had been converted into churches and mosques. Rural areas in the Islamic world have some good remains, which had been left largely undisturbed. In Spain, some remarkable discoveries (Vic, Cordoba, Barcelona) were made in the 19th century, when old buildings being reconstructed or demolished were found to contain major remains encased in later buildings. In Rome, Pula, and elsewhere some walls incorporated in later buildings have always been evident.  In most cases loose pieces of stone have been removed from the site, and some such as capitals may be found in local museums, along with non-architectural items excavated, such as terracotta votive offerings, which are often found in large numbers.

Rome 
 Pantheon or Temple to All The Gods – Campus Martius
 Temple of Antoninus and Faustina, the core of the building survives as a church, including parts of the frieze, – Roman Forum
 Temple of Hadrian, a huge wall with eleven columns, now incorporated in a later building – Campus Martius 
 Temple of Hercules Victor, early circular temple, largely complete 
 Nymphaeum often called (erroneously) the Temple of Minerva Medica
 Temple of Portunus (formerly called the Temple of Fortuna Virilis), near Santa Maria in Cosmedin and the Temple of Hercules Victor
 Temple of Romulus, very complete circular exterior, early 4th century – Roman Forum
 Temple of Saturn, eight impressive columns and architrave remain standing, west end of the Roman Forum
 Temple of Vesta, small circular temple, part complete – Roman Forum

Elsewhere
 Palestrina, Sanctuary of Fortuna Primigenia, (see above) a large complex leading to a small shrine
 Temple of Apollo (Pompeii), unusually, it is the smaller elements that are best preserved, and the surrounding forum 
 Temple of Bellona (Ostia), small back-street all-brick temple at the port.
 Temple of Vesta, Tivoli, so-called, circular
 Capitolium of Brixia, Brescia, buried by a landslide and partly reconstructed
 Temple of Minerva, Assisi, preserved façade with six Corynthian columns, architrave and pediment.
 Temple of Augustus (Pozzuoli) (it), Pozzuoli, pseudoperipteral temple in Parian marble, the structure of the temple re-emerged after the 1964 fire destroyed the central nave of the Baroque church that incorporated it, it's been since restored and reopened.
 Temple of Augustus (Pula), Pula, Croatia, largely complete (illustrated above); a large wall from another temple forms part of the town hall next door.
 Roman Temple of Évora, Évora, Portugal, impressive partial remains of a small temple
 Temple of Jupiter in Diocletian's Palace, Split, Croatia. Small but very complete, amid other Roman buildings, c. 300. Most unusually, the barrel ceiling is intact.
 Roman temple of Alcántara, Spain, tiny but complete
 Roman temple of Vic, Spain. Substantially rebuilt, after it was found covered by a castle.
 Roman temple of Córdoba, Spain. Base and 11 Corinthian columns, found inside later buildings.
 Maison Carrée, Nîmes, Southern France, one of the most complete survivals
 Temple of Augustus and Livia, Vienne, France, exterior largely complete
 Temple of Bacchus, Baalbek, Lebanon, a famous exotic "Baroque" pilgrimage destination, very largely preserved, including the interior.
 Temples of Jupiter and Venus, Baalbek
 Temple of Artemis (Jerash), Jordan; partial remains of two other temples
 Sbeitla, Tunisia, three small temples in a row on the forum, many other city ruins.
 Dougga, Tunisia, several temples in extensive city ruins, two with substantial remains.

Ruins, fragments, bases and excavations

Britain

Temple of Claudius, Colchester; some of the base can be seen in the basements of Colchester Castle, which was built over it.
 Pagans Hill Roman Temple, Somerset, England, Romano-Celtic circular (octagonal) temple, the foundations excavated
 Maiden Castle, Dorset, England
 Roman Baths (Bath) and Temple of Sulis Minerva, Bath, Somerset, England
 London Mithraeum, Londinium; the reassembled foundations can be seen from the street at Temple Court, Queen Victoria Street, London EC4.

Italy

Rome

 Temple of Apollo Palatinus – Palatine Hill
 Temple of Apollo Sosianus – Near the Theater of Marcellus
 Temple of Bellona (Rome) – Near the Theater of Marcellus
 Temple of Bona Dea – Aventine Hill
 Largo di Torre Argentina – remains of four small temples of the Republic can be see 
 Temple of Caesar – Roman Forum
 Temple of Castor and Pollux - In the Roman Forum
 Temple of Claudius
 Temple of Concord – Roman Forum at the base of the Capitoline
 Temple of Cybele (Magna Mater) – Palatine Hill
 Temple of Diana – Aventine Hill
 Temple of Divus Augustus behind Basilica Julia
 Temple of Isis and Serapis – Campus Martius
 Temple of Janus (Roman Forum)
 Temple of Janus (Forum Holitorium)
 Temple of Juno Moneta – Capitoline Hill
 Temple of Jupiter (Capitoline Hill) – Capitoline Hill (under Palazzo Conservatori)
 Temple of Jupiter Stator (3rd century BC) – in front of the gate of the Palatine Hill
 Temple of Jupiter Stator (2nd century BC) – in the southern Campus Martius
 Temple of Mars Ultor – Forum of Augustus
 Temple of Minerva Medica, named in literary sources but no longer extant
 Temple of Peace – Forum of Peace (now mostly covered by Via dei Fori Imperiali)
 Temple of Siriaco – Janiculum Hill
 Temple of Venus and Roma – Northeast corner of the Roman Forum
 Temple of Venus Genetrix – Forum of Caesar
 Temple of Vespasian and Titus, three columns still stand in the Roman Forum, with other fragments elsewhere
 Temple of Veiovis – Capitoline Hill (Basement of Palazzo Senatorio)

Lebanon

 The 30 or so Temples of Mount Hermon are a group of small temples and shrines, some with substantial remains. Some are in modern Syria and Israel.
 Temples of the Beqaa Valley, including Baalbek (see above).
 Aaiha
 Aaqbe
 Afka
 Ain Aata
 Ain Harcha, good remains on a ridge-top outside town
 Antoura
 Bakka, Lebanon
Bziza
 Dakoue
 Deir El Aachayer 
 Edde
 Hebbariye
 Hosn Niha
 Kafr Zebad
 Kalaa
 Kfar Qouq
 Khirbet El-Knese
 Labweh
 Libbaya
 Makam Er-Rab
 Mejdal Anjar
 Nebi Safa
 Niha Bekaa, 4 small temples to local gods with partial remains, 1st century AD on.
 Qal'at Bustra
 Qasr Banat
 Saraain El Faouqa
 Shheem
 Yaat
 Yanta
 Sfire

Malta

 Temple of Apollo in Melite (modern Mdina) – some ruins dismantled in the 18th century and stones reused in other buildings; part of podium still exists
 Temple of Juno in Gaulos (modern Victoria, Gozo) – ruins dismantled in 1697–1711 during the construction of the Cathedral of the Assumption; some remains survive beneath the cathedral
 Temple of Juno at Tas-Silġ, near Marsaxlokk – some foundations survive
 Temple of Proserpina in Mtarfa – ruins dismantled in the 17th-18th centuries and stones reused in other buildings; an inscription, a fragment of a marble column and parts of a Punic cornice survive

Romania
Not much remains to be seen, but there were temples at Ulpia Traiana Sarmizegetusa (6), Alburnus Major (2), Apulum, Tibiscum Porolissum and probably Potaissa (suggested by five neighboring altars), as well as other sites.

Scotland
 Arthur's O'on, Stenhousemuir, Scotland. Unusual stone "beehive"-shaped building, probably a temple, destroyed in 1743.

Slovenia
 Temple of Hercules – Celje, Slovenia.
 Gallo-Roman Temple – Celje, Slovenia - remains of Gallo-Roman Temple.

Spain

 Temple of Augustus in Barcelona - Barcelona, Spain. Four large columns on base, found within a later building.
 Temple of Diana, Mérida, Mérida, Spain.

Syria 
 Rakhleh, and other Temples of Mount Hermon
 Burqush
 Temple of Bel, Palmyra
 Temple of Jupiter, Damascus, Syria
 Temple of Zeus Hypsistos, Al-Dumayr
 Funerary Temple (Palmyra)
 Temple of Bel-Shamin (Palmyra)
 Roman temple at Al-Mushannaf
 Latakia Tetraporticus
 Temple of Zeus Theos, Dura Europos
 Temple of Atargatis, Dura Europos
 Temple of the Gadde, Dura Europos
 Temple of Adonis, Dura Europos
 Temple of Artemis Azzinoth Kona, Dura Europos
 Tempel of Zeus Kyrios     
 Temple of Zeus Megistos, Dura Europos                           
 Temple of Artemis Nanaia, Dura Europs
 Hosn Suleiman Temple
 Bakhos Temple Latakia
 Masmiyah-Phaena Temple
 Temple of Bel, Dura Europos
 Temple of Augustus, Caesarea Philippi 
 Temple of Zeus, Caesarea Philippi 
 Upper Tomb Temple, Caesarea Philippi
 Lower Tomb Temple, Caesarea Philippi
 Horvat Omrit Temple (Augustus Temple)
 Court of Pan, Caesarea Philippi
 Atil, Roman temples
 Sia Roman Temple, southeren Syria 
 Athriya Roman Temple
 Temple of Zeus Bomos, Baqirha
 The remains of the 2nd-century Roman temple of Tyche in al-Sanamayn
 Temple of Allat, Palmyra 
 Temple of Nabu, Palmyra
 Temple of Baal-hamon, Palmyra
 Roman Temple Kalybe (Bosra al-Sham) 
 Temple of the Tyche - Apamea
 Roman Syria Temples (Modern Lebanon)- (Modern Israel/Golan Heights)
 The 30 or so Temples of Mount Hermon are a group of small temples and shrines, some with substantial remains. Some are in modern Lebanon and Israel.
 Roman Temple at Harran al-Awamid
 Roman Temple in Qasr Chbib
 Temple dedicated to sun god (Helios), As-Suwayda Qanawat (Kanawat)
 Temple of Bacchus in present-day Latakia
 Korsei el-Debb Roman temple
 Temple of Rabbos, Al Quanawat
 Temple to the sun god El Gabal, with the holy stone.
 2 Temples: Temple of Zeus end TEMPLE CYRRHUS SYRIA, PHILIP II

Tunisia

 Djebel Zaghouan ("water temple" at the start of an aqueduct for Carthage)
 Dougga (ruins of several temples)
 Oudna
 Pheradi Majus (Bouficha)
 Segermes
 Thuburbo Majus (ruins of several temples)

Turkey
 Aphrodisias, remains of two temples, with unusually good reliefs in situ and in the local museum (the city had especially fine marble).
 Temple of Augustus in Ancyra - Ankara, Turkey
 Ephesus, remains of 4 temples, that of Hadrian the best, with a nymphaeum of Trajan.
 Temple of Trajan, Pergamon, part reconstructed. Remains of other temples.
 Side, remains of three temples
 Donuktas Roman Temple - Tarsus

Notes

References
"EERA" = Boëthius, Axel, Ling, Roger, Rasmussen, Tom, Etruscan and Early Roman Architecture, Yale/Pelican history of art, 1978, Yale University Press, 9780300052909, google books
Wheeler, Mortimer, Roman Art and Architecture, 1964, Thames and Hudson (World of Art), 

Temples